Max Steinberg (born July 9, 1988) is an American professional poker player from Fairfield, Iowa currently residing in Las Vegas, Nevada. He won a bracelet at the 2012 World Series of Poker and finished in fourth place in the 2015 WSOP Main Event.

Poker career
Steinberg dropped out of American University in 2008 to pursue a full-time profession in poker. Max and his identical twin brother Daniel Steinberg focus on live tournaments. His first cash was in 2008 finishing runner up at the Latin American Poker Tour $2,500 No Limit Hold'em event for $144,773.

Steinberg won his first bracelet in a $1,000 no limit hold'em event. He finished 131st in the 2013 World Series of Poker Main Event and fourth in 2015.

As of 2015, his total live tournament earnings exceed $4,550,000.

World Series of Poker

References

External links

1988 births
American poker players
World Series of Poker bracelet winners
People from Fairfield, Iowa
People from Oakland, California
Living people